This was the first edition of the tournament.

Julia Grabher won the title, defeating Aliona Bolsova in the final, 6–3, 7–6(7–3).

Seeds

Draw

Finals

Top half

Bottom half

References

External Links
Main Draw

Open Internacional de San Sebastián - Singles